is a Japanese speed skater. She competed in the women's 1500 metres at the 2002 Winter Olympics.

References

1980 births
Living people
Japanese female speed skaters
Olympic speed skaters of Japan
Speed skaters at the 2002 Winter Olympics
People from Obihiro, Hokkaido
Speed skaters at the 2003 Asian Winter Games